NBC Montana is a regional network of three television stations in western Montana, United States, affiliated with NBC and owned by Sinclair Broadcast Group. It is headquartered in Missoula, and serves as the NBC affiliate for the Missoula and Butte markets. 

The network comprises flagship KECI-TV (channel 13) in Missoula; full-power satellites KTVM-TV (channel 6) in Butte and  KCFW-TV (channel 9) in Kalispell; and low-power satellite KDBZ-CD (channel 6) in Bozeman. Most station operations, including news production, are based in Missoula, with bureaus in Bozeman and Kalispell. 

The stations air the same programming, but KTVM and KCFW air separate commercials and legal identifications. KDBZ is a straight simulcast of KTVM. NBC Montana's reach is further extended by 25 translators in western Montana and Idaho. 

The main station, KECI, began broadcasting in 1954 as KGVO-TV. Regional coverage became a reality in the 1960s with the installation of transmitters in Butte and Kalispell. The stations have been sole NBC affiliates since 1989. Sinclair purchased the group in 2017 as part of its acquisition of Bonten Media Group.

History
On March 11, 1953, the Federal Communications Commission (FCC) granted Mosby's, Incorporated, owner of KGVO (1290 AM) in Missoula, a construction permit for a new television station on channel 13 in Missoula. Construction began in November 1953 on the road to the mountaintop facility, the first of its kind in the state and at the highest elevation of any television transmitter of the period in the northwestern United States; while two stations had gone on the air in Butte and a third in Billings, neither built their transmitters atop mountains.

KGVO-TV began telecasting July 1, 1954. Originally, the station was a primary CBS affiliate, owing to its radio sister's long affiliation with CBS radio, but also carried programming from ABC and DuMont; it would lose DuMont when the network shut down in 1956. While the studios were originally at the transmitter site, owner Arthur Mosby purchased an American Legion hall in downtown Missoula that had been gutted by fire and renovated it to serve as new studios. On December 1, 1956, the station's studios moved from its transmitter location to its radio sister's studios on West Main Street in downtown Missoula and concurrently changed its call letters to KMSO-TV, representing Missoula's airport code. By 1957, KMSO had added a secondary affiliation with NBC. Mosby sold KGVO radio to Dale Moore in 1959 but held on to KMSO-TV until 1964, when Moore bought channel 13 as well; upon taking over, he changed its call letters back to KGVO-TV.

Under Moore's ownership, KGVO-TV switched its primary affiliation to NBC in 1965, though it still carried some CBS and ABC programming. The transmitter was destroyed by fire in November 1966; the FCC permitted the installation of two interim translators to get the station back on air until the TV Mountain facility could be reconstructed.

Additionally, the station pursued a policy of regional expansion. In 1965, it built a 100-watt translator on channel 9 in Kalispell. The Flathead had been without a local station since the folding of KGEZ-TV/KULR in 1959. That December, the FCC simultaneously approved a channel 6 translator for KGVO-TV in Butte and a translator for Butte's local station, CBS affiliate KXLF-TV, in Missoula. On June 10, 1968, the Kalispell translator was upgraded to a full-power semi-satellite under the call letters KCFW-TV, while the Butte translator was replaced with full-power semi-satellite KTVM in May 1970. In 1976, primary coverage of ABC programs shifted from KGVO-TV to KXLF and its Missoula satellite, KPAX-TV.

Dale Moore's Western Broadcasting Company reached a deal to sell KGVO-TV, KCFW, and KTVM to Eagle Communications, Inc.—a company formed by former The Ed Sullivan Show producer Robert Precht and Advance Communications, owner of KFBB-TV in Great Falls—in 1977. Despite a protest from a citizens' group, Montanans for Quality Television, the deal received FCC approval in September 1978, and on November 1, KGVO-TV became KECI-TV. The new owners pledged to improve news coverage, in part under a pact with the citizens' group, The Eagle stations also aired Sesame Street for three years from 1978 to 1981, dropping the program due to a lack of underwriters.

Eagle demonstrated an increased commitment to the Butte area, which had never been served by any specific local programming even after the launch of KTVM. After expressing interest in establishing a Butte office in 1978, the station did so in 1982 and began producing local news reports for inclusion in KECI's newscasts. Precht Communications, a sister company to Sullivan Productions, acquired full control of Eagle Communications by 1981. NBC signed primary affiliation agreements with the Eagle stations in 1983; though they were dual NBC–CBS affiliates on paper, the best CBS shows aired on KXLF–KPAX, and CBS had turned down Eagle's bid for primary affiliation with that network to protect its relationship with the other stations in the Montana Television Network (MTN).

In 1984, KXLF–KPAX and the other MTN stations became full-time CBS outlets. As a result, most ABC programs moved to the Eagle network. Between 1984 and 1989, KECI aired an 11 p.m. late local newscast—highly unusual for the Mountain Time Zone (most network affiliates in the Mountain Time Zone aired their late newscasts at 10 p.m.). While this allowed KECI to clear more ABC programs, it created further scheduling headaches and put its late news at a disadvantage. Viewers cited confusion over the availability of programs, and returning the late news to 10 p.m. allowed Eagle to restore The Tonight Show and Saturday Night Live to its lineup en route to becoming a sole NBC affiliate. A full-time ABC outlet for Missoula, KTMF (channel 23), was established in 1990.

The 1980s also saw Eagle seek to increase its presence in Bozeman. It first attempted to buy the construction permit for KCTZ, a channel 7 station that had sought an ABC affiliation only to have its hopes dashed by Eagle's June 1984 acquisition of the ABC rights in the Missoula–Butte market. The opposition of two local residents and radio station owners caused the deal to languish for 16 months at the FCC until the green light was given in January 1986, and the deal fell apart. In 1989, Eagle purchased the construction permit for low-power K42BZ, which took to the air in 1993 as a separate station. 

In 1997, Precht sold the Eagle system to Lamco Communications, which in turn sold its stations to Bluestone Television in 2004. Bonten Media Group acquired the BlueStone stations in 2007. Under Bonten, K42BZ was upgraded to Class A status as KDBZ-CD.

On April 21, 2017, Sinclair Broadcast Group announced its intent to purchase the Bonten stations for $240 million. The sale was completed September 1.

News operations
Historically, the stations aired a mix of local and regional news programming. From the outset in 1968, KCFW produced its own early evening newscast; it was not until the mid-1980s that one was established at KTVM in Butte. By 1993, the three Eagle network stations aired regional newscasts from Missoula at 5 and 10 p.m. and local news programs for their specific areas at 6 p.m. That year, the company underwent a major restructuring of its news operations, untangling the stations from each other to produce local 6 and 10 p.m. programs, and it announced the addition of a fourth local news service for Bozeman. The weekend newscasts for Bozeman were that city's first; the only other news operation in the city, at KCTZ, aired five days a week.

The Bozeman newscast debuted October 4, 1993. Just 25 days later, citing costs, Eagle opted to shutter the Butte operation and originate news for both areas from Bozeman, firing the 15 news and production staffers it had in the Mining City. At the same time, KECI anchor Jill Valley defected to crosstown competitor KPAX, causing the station to plunge in the ratings—especially in Missoula itself.

Notable former on-air staff
 Dari Nowkhah — former sports director for KCFW; later anchor of ESPN SportsCenter; currently lead anchor at the SEC Network
 Meg Oliver — ABC News reporter, former anchor of Up to the Minute, worked as a reporter and anchor at KCFW

Stations

Main stations

Notes:
1. KECI-TV used the call sign KGVO-TV from sign-on until December 1, 1956, KMSO-TV from December 1, 1956 to December 16, 1964, and back to KGVO-TV from December 16, 1964 to November 1, 1978.
2. KTVM-TV used the call sign KTVM (without the -TV suffix) from sign-on until July 1, 2009.
3. KDBZ-CD used the call sign K42BZ from sign-on until January 3, 2011, K42BZ-D from January 3 to August 10, 2011, back to K42BZ on August 10, 2011, and back to K42BZ-D from August 10, 2011 to October 14, 2014.

Translators

Technical information

Subchannels
The stations' digital signals are multiplexed:

Analog-to-digital conversion
All stations shut down their analog signals on June 12, 2009, the official date in which full-power television stations in the United States transitioned from analog to digital broadcasts under federal mandate. The station's digital channel allocations post-transition are as follows:
 KECI-TV shut down its analog signal, over VHF channel 13; the station's digital signal relocated from its pre-transition UHF channel 40 to VHF channel 13.
 KCFW-TV shut down its analog signal, over VHF channel 9; the station's digital signal relocated from its pre-transition UHF channel 38 to VHF channel 9.
 KTVM-TV shut down its analog signal, over VHF channel 6; the station's digital signal relocated from its pre-transition UHF channel 33 to VHF channel 6.

References

External links
 

Television stations in Missoula, Montana
NBC network affiliates
Comet (TV network) affiliates
Charge! (TV network) affiliates
Television channels and stations established in 1954
1954 establishments in Montana
Sinclair Broadcast Group